The NATYCAA Cup, known for sponsorship reasons as the Daktronics Cup, is an award given annually by the National Alliance of Two Year College Athletic Administrators to the junior and community colleges in the United States with the most success in collegiate athletics. The competition was founded in 2003 as the junior college equivalent to the NACDA Directors' Cup. Points for the NATYCAA Cup are based on order of finish in various championships sponsored by the National Junior College Athletic Association and state associations (specifically the California Community College Athletic Association and Northwest Athletic Conference). Three awards are given annually: one to the most successful school in the NJCAA scholarship division, one to the most successful school in the NJCAA non-scholarship division, and one to the most successful school in a state association (combined standings between the CCCAA and NWAC). Since 2011–12, the most successful school between the three divisions is awarded the Two Year College Directors' Cup.

Past winners 
Teams in bold indicate winners of the Two Year College Directors' Cup for that season.

NJCAA Scholarship Division

NJCCA Non-Scholarship Division

State Association Division

See also 
 NACDA Directors' Cup
 Capital One Cup
 List of sport awards

References 

College sports trophies and awards in the United States
National Junior College Athletic Association
Awards established in 2004